Thérèse Sita-Bella (1933–27 February 2006), born Thérèse Bella Mbida, was a Cameroonian film director who became the first woman filmmaker of Africa and Cameroon.

Early life and education
She was born into the Beti tribe in southern Cameroon, and received her education from Catholic missionaries. In the 1950s, after obtaining her baccalaureate from a school in the Cameroonian capital of Yaoundé, she went to Paris in order to continue her studies. It was in France that her interest in journalism and in film developed.

Career
In 1955, Sita-Bella started her career as a journalist. Later on, in 1963, Sita-Bella became the first woman filmmaker in Cameroon and all of Africa. From 1964 to 1965, Sita-Bella worked in France at the French newspaper La Vie Africane, which she co-created. After returning to Cameroon in 1967, she joined the Ministry of Information and became the Deputy Chief of Information.

Tam Tam à Paris
In 1963, Sita-Bella directed the documentary Tam-Tam à Paris, which followed a troupe from the Cameroonian National Ensemble during a tour of Paris. Tam Tam à Paris is frequently cited as being the first film by a woman from sub-Saharan Africa. In 1969, Tam Tam à Paris featured at the first Week of African Cinema, a festival that was later to become known as FESPACO.

Sita-Bella was considered to be a trailblazer and one of the rare women working in the film industry that was being dominated by men. She spoke about the film industry in the 1970s by saying:

"Camerawomen in the 1970s? At that time we were very few. There were few West Indians, a woman from Senegal called Safi Faye and I. But you know cinema is not a woman's business".

Death
On 27 February 2006, Sita-Bella died at a hospital in Yaoundé from colon cancer. Sita-Bella was buried at the Mvolye cemetery in Yaoundé.

Honors
The Sita Bella film hall at the Cameroon Cultural Centre was named after her.

References

Cameroonian feminists
Cameroonian film directors
Cameroonian documentary filmmakers
Cameroonian journalists
Cameroonian women film directors
1933 births
2006 deaths
Cameroonian women journalists
Deaths from cancer in Cameroon
Women documentary filmmakers
20th-century journalists